Sladkovo is the name of several rural localities in Russia:
Sladkovo, Orenburg Oblast, a selo in Sladkovsky Selsoviet of Ileksky District of Orenburg Oblast
Sladkovo, Tyumen Oblast, a selo in Sladkovsky District of Tyumen Oblast